Stiles is an unincorporated community in the town of Stiles in Oconto County, Wisconsin, United States. It is located on U.S. Route 141 at its intersections with County I, Wisconsin Highway 22 and the Oconto River.

References

External Links 

Unincorporated communities in Oconto County, Wisconsin
Unincorporated communities in Wisconsin